K. Nageshwar is an Indian professor, politician, and political analyst. He served as member of the Andhra Pradesh Legislative Council and subsequently in Telangana Legislative Council  during 2007 to 2015. Nageshwar is a professor at the Department of Communication & Journalism, Osmania University, Hyderabad, India.

Career 
He won the elections to the Legislative Council from the Graduates’ Constituency of Hyderabad, Mahabubnagar and Ranga Reddy districts first in 2007 and subsequently in 2009. Contesting as an Independent Candidate, he defeated the candidates belonging to the major political parties.

Earlier, he worked with Indian Express and the Times of India groups. During over three decades of journalistic experience, he published articles in the leading newspapers/magazines . He regularly comments on TV channels and YouTube channel on wide-ranging issues of contemporary nature. Leading websites publish his articles.

He received the Junior Research Fellowship in Journalism in 1986. He won the UGC Career Award in 1994. He has been the visiting professor at Birla Institute of Technology and Sciences, BITS Pilani, Hyderabad; National Academy of Administration, Mussoorie, National Police Academy, DR MCR Institute of Human Resource Development, NALSAR, SRM University and many Journalism Schools.

He is the former editor of The Hans India, English Daily. He was earlier the Editor-in-Chief of Telugu news channel HMTV. He was the founder chairman on 10TV.  He is the author of the books Interpreting Contemporary India; How to win at life.

References 

 https://web.archive.org/web/20120801221958/http://tsr.net.co/author/knageshwar
 http://www.outlookindia.com/article.aspx?282470
 
 https://www.youtube.com/user/TheKntv?feature=watch
 http://www.bits-pilani.ac.in/hyderabad/Economics/Faculty
 https://web.archive.org/web/20130509114657/http://www.caluniv.ac.in/Global%20mdia%20journal/advisory_board.html
 https://www.deccanchronicle.com/nation/politics/230221/never-sought-trs-support-prof-k-nageshwar.html

Year of birth missing (living people)
Living people
Journalists from Telangana
Osmania University alumni
Members of the Andhra Pradesh Legislative Council